= Hjalmar Cornilsen =

Swedish architect

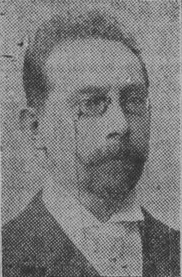
- Born: 1857
- Died: 1937
- Occupation: Architect

Hjalmar Algot Cornilsen (5 April 1857 – 1937) was a Swedish architect.

Cornilsen studied at Chalmerska slöjdskolan until 1875 and thereafter in Germany. He worked for Adrian C. Peterson in Gothenburg from 1875 to 1890 and operated his own business from 1890 to 1928.

== Sources ==
Biography by KulturNav in Swedish
